The Bay of Grama ( — ) is a bay in the Ionian Sea situated along the Albanian Ionian Sea Coast on the Mediterranean Sea in Southern Europe. It is one of many bays of the western Ceraunian Mountains along the Albanian Riviera south of the Karaburun Peninsula. The bay is primarily known as a touristic place, and for the engraved inscriptions in the surrounding coastal cliffs as its name relieves.

Name
The name of the bay is closely associated with the engraved inscriptions in the surrounding coastal cliffs; Grama for the Greek word for 'letter'. It is also referred to as Gram(m)ata, the plural form of 'Gram(m)a' from the inscriptions of thanksgiving left by Greek, Roman and medieval sailors in honour of the Dioscuri, Castor and Pollux, and other patrons.

Human history
In antiquity the bay of Grama was the only safe cove along the coast west of the Ceraunian Mountains. The bay is home to precious archaeological, historical and cultural values, as it served as an important harbour and shelter for those sailing along the coast during classical antiquity. On the vertical cliffs and rocks, there are numerous carved inscriptions in Ancient Greek, Latin and Medieval Greek. This kind of inscriptions were known in antiquity as euploia inscriptions.

During the Second World War, it was used as a base for the Special Operations Executive.

Geomorphology
Representing a rocky bay, the shore is dominated by coastal cliffs, sloping vertically into the sea and rocky, pebbled beaches. It stretches within the Karaburun-Sazan Marine Park and was designated as a natural monument because of its outstanding landscape dotted with solutional and sea caves.

Biodiversity
The precious landscapes of the bay are of global importance, because they contribute to the country's ecological balance and provide habitat for numerous globally threatened and endangered species. The sea caves are an exceptional ecosystem and give important refuge to the mediterranean monk seal, the rarest seal species in the world.

See also 
 
 Albanian Ionian Sea Coast
 List of bays of Albania 
 Biodiversity of Albania
 Geography of Albania
 Protected areas of Albania

References

Sources

Bays of Albania
Bays of the Mediterranean
Bodies of water of Albania 
Albanian Ionian Sea Coast
Karaburun-Sazan Marine Park